Pleasant Goat and Big Big Wolf - Moon Castle: The Space Adventure (喜羊羊与灰太狼之兔年顶呱呱 Xǐ Yáng Yáng yǔ Huī Tài Láng zhī tùnián dǐngguāguā "Pleasant Goat and Grey Wolf's Excellent Year of the Rabbit") is a 2011 Chinese animated comedy film directed by Sung Pong Choo and part of the film series based on the Pleasant Goat and Big Big Wolf animated television series. The film was released on January 21, 2011. It is preceded by Pleasant Goat and Big Big Wolf: The Tiger Prowess (2010) and is followed by Mission Incredible: Adventures on the Dragon's Trail (2012).

Plot
The plot follows the goats, who go to the moon in a candy-shaped spaceship in order to assist the Queen of the Moon. The Bitter Gourd King and his gourd troopers are attacking the World of Sweetness with bitter juice, and the Queen needs the help of the goats. Wolfie and his family come with the goats by accident. At one point the Gourd King kidnaps Wolfie's family, and Weslie comes to tears upon seeing his parents.

Voice cast
Lin Zhang
Yuting Deng
Ying Liang
Hongyun Liu
Quansheng Gao
Na Zhao
 
The Cantonese version of the film has a voice cast including Michael Tse, Kate Tsui and Evergreen Mak Cheung-ching.

Production
The film emphasizes importance of family. Yu said "Unlike the mostly fun plots in the previous two sequels, we play up the love theme this time."

Release
The film was scheduled to be released on Friday January 28, 2011, in Mainland China. Yu Tak-wai, the creative director of Creative Power Entertaining, stated that the film was scheduled to be released in Hong Kong, Macau, and Taiwan later during the year 2011. It was released in China on January 21, 2011, during the Chinese New Year.

Reception

Box office
A 2011 China Daily article stated that the film was predicted to make over 150 million yuan ($25 million US). The film earned  at the Chinese box office.

References

External links

 Moon Castle: The Space Adventure  (SWF)

2011 films
Pleasant Goat and Big Big Wolf films
2010s Mandarin-language films
Chinese animated films
2011 animated films
Animated comedy films
2011 comedy films